Laszlo Levente Balatoni (29 January 1910 – 18 August 2000), alias Levente Ladislas Balatony, was a Hungarian alpine skier who competed in the inaugural alpine skiing event in the 1936 Winter Olympics.  He finished 38th among 66 competitors.  

He became a naturalised UK citizen in July 1955 and was living there at the time of his death.

References

1910 births
2000 deaths
Hungarian male alpine skiers
Olympic alpine skiers of Hungary
Alpine skiers at the 1936 Winter Olympics